The Cole Marionettes was a Chicago marionette troupe founded by George and Lucille Cole circa 1934. The Cole Marionettes had several companies touring schools throughout the Midwest from the 1930s through the late 1980s.  Usually based on famous fairy tales and myths, typical productions included The Tinder Box, Jason and the Golden Fleece, The Steadfast Tin Soldier, Beauty and the Beast, and Jack and the Beanstalk.

A lifelong circus enthusiast, George Cole created The Cole Circus, a popular marionette variety show touring for more than 40 years.  George Cole died in 1986, preceding wife and partner Lucille's death by only a few years. Danny Goldring was among the many people who worked as Cole puppeteers over the years.

References

External links
  - The Puppeteers of America Audio/Visual Library, which includes video performances of (among others) the Cole Marionettes

Puppet troupes
Puppetry in the United States